James Patrick Gorman  (born 14 July 1958) is an Australian-American financier who is the chairman and chief executive officer of Morgan Stanley. He was formerly Co-President and Co-Head of Strategic Planning at the firm.

Early life
James P. Gorman was born in Melbourne, Australia. He is one of 12 children, two of who have passed away. He was educated at Xavier College, and earned his Bachelor of Arts and Bachelor of Laws from the University of Melbourne, where he was a residential member and president of Newman College.

Career
In 1982 he joined law firm Phillips Fox and Masel (now DLA Piper) before heading to the United States to obtain a Master of Business Administration from Columbia Business School.

After graduating Columbia, he joined McKinsey & Company and eventually became a senior partner. At McKinsey he worked on the Merrill Lynch account for ten years, and helped develop Merrill's online internet strategy. In 1999, he joined Merrill Lynch in the newly created role of chief marketing officer.  He also joined the 19-member executive management committee.  Within two years, he was in charge of Merrill's brokerage business.

Gorman left Merrill in February 2006 to join Morgan Stanley as the President and Chief Operating Officer of the Global Wealth Management Group (GWMG). In October 2007, Gorman took on the additional role of Co-Head of Strategic Planning with Chief Financial Officer Colm Kelleher. In December 2007, he was named Co-President of Morgan Stanley, along with Walid Chammah, with the day-to-day responsibility for Wealth Management and Asset Management.

In 2009, he helped create the largest wealth management platform globally when he led the merger and integration of Morgan Stanley's wealth management business with Citi's Smith Barney business. Structured as a staggered acquisition, Morgan Stanley purchased the remainder of the joint venture in June 2013, and is a global leader in wealth management with over 16,000 financial advisors and $1.8 trillion in client assets.

In September 2009, it was announced he would become CEO of Morgan Stanley in January 2010. He also assumed the title of Chairman in January 2012 following the retirement of John J. Mack. Press reports indicate his compensation as Chairman and CEO was $9.75 million for 2012, with the New York Times reporting an increase to $18 million in 2013.

In 2014 he was included in the 50 Most Influential ranking of Bloomberg Markets Magazine.

In the wake of the 2016 United Kingdom European Union membership referendum, which led to a popular vote to leave the European Union, Gorman said there was "nothing good about Brexit". He added that some jobs would be moved not only out of England, but out of Europe entirely, possibly to New York City or Tokyo.

In January 2020, he was appointed an Officer of the Order of Australia (AO) that recognizes Australians who have demonstrated outstanding service or exceptional achievement. Gorman said he was "honoured to receive this award and extremely proud to represent Australia abroad." "While most of my working life has been in the US my heart remains firmly Australian," Mr Gorman said.

As a result of his work in 2020, James Gorman was paid a 22% raise ($6 million) from 2019 pay of $27 million by Morgan Stanley, making him the highest-paid bank executive in America. The Wall Street firm generated record revenue that year and announced two multibillion-dollar acquisitions of E*trade Financial Corp. and Eaton Vance Corp. and avoided much of the economic recession caused by the pandemic.

Gorman is scheduled to speak at the November 2022 Global Financial Leaders' Investment Summit, with the Hong Kong Democracy Council claiming that his presence, along with other financial executives, legitimizes the Hong Kong government's whitewashing of the erosion of freedoms in the city. Several members of Congress also warned that US financial executives should not attend the Summit, saying "Their presence only serves to legitimise the swift dismantling of Hong Kong's autonomy, free press and the rule of law by Hong Kong authorities acting along with the Chinese Communist Party."

Board memberships
Gorman serves as a Director of the Council on Foreign Relations, and Chair of the Board of Overseers of the Columbia Business School, and is a member of the Financial Services Forum, Business Council and the Business Roundtable. He formerly served as a Director of the Federal Reserve Bank of New York, President of the Federal Advisory Council to the U.S. Federal Reserve Board, Co-Chairman of the Partnership for New York City, Co-Chairman the Business Committee of the Metropolitan Museum of Art and served on the board and as Chairman (2006) of the Securities Industry and Financial Markets Association in Washington, D.C.

Personal life
Gorman is a dual citizen of Australia and the United States and lives in Manhattan. He has two adult children. Gorman earned $27 million in 2019.

References

Australian chairpersons of corporations
Australian expatriates in the United States
Australian people of Irish descent
Columbia Business School alumni
Directors of Morgan Stanley
Living people
McKinsey & Company people
Morgan Stanley employees
People educated at Xavier College
Businesspeople from Melbourne
Melbourne Law School alumni
1958 births
Federal Reserve Bank of New York
Officers of the Order of Australia
American chief executives of Fortune 500 companies